Luzhi Town is a famous historic old town located in the Wuzhong District, 18 km east of Suzhou, Jiangsu province, China.

Etymology
It was also known as Puli, an ancient name for this town.  This river town was named after a Tang dynasty recluse poet Lu Guimeng who retired in this town. Lu Guimong had a pseudonym: Mr. Pu-li.

At that time, Puli consisted of two districts: Puli and Liuzhi. Liuzhi meant that there were six straight rivers in the town. In the Suzhou dialect, "liu" was pronounced as "lu", and  pronounced as Luzhi.  At the end of the Qing dynasty, Puli was changed to Luzhi township of Yuanhe County.

Luzhi is famous for its beautiful waterways and ancient bridges, some of the bridges dated back to the Song dynasty. A walk in the ancient town Luzhi is said to be a walk into history frozen in time, tranquil and serene.

The Ming dynasty poet Gao Qi poem : "Scene of Puli" is still an accurate description of the scenery in the ancient town Luzhi today:
Scene of Puli
Long bridge short bridge with willows
Front stream rear stream with lotus
People watching banner over wine store risen
Seagulls escort boat to home of fishman.

Luzhi is one of the best preserved old towns in China, along with its old canals and streets.  In 2003, the Chinese government published a list of "Ten Famous Chinese Historical Townships", with Luzhi featured on this list. In 2004, Luzhi was awarded a Township Preservation Award by UNESCO.

Sights 
 The old town and its canals.
 Baosheng Temple. Baoshen Temple boasts a history of thousand years, built in the second year of Tianjiang of Liang Dynasty (503 AD). By Song dynasty it was called the Baoshen Zen Temple, with 5000 halls and one thousand monks.
The Arhat statues in the Baoshen Temple are national treasures. They were the work of the Tang Dynasty sculptor Yang Huizhi.
 Tang Dynasty poet Lu Guimong tomb, with Fare Breeze Pavilion and two of his hand planted ginkgo trees.
 Former Residence of Shen Bohan
 First reformer Wang Tao Memorial Hall
 Educator and writer Ye Shengtao Memorial Hall, at former site of The 5th High School where Ye Shengtao taught from 1917 - 1922.

Food 
 Puli Trotters and Puli duck: Two dishes in Luzhi township are Puli trotters and Puli duck. They are said to be prepared according to the recipe of poet Mr. Pu-li; he often treated guests with these two dishes.
 Luzhi Radish, a pickled radish prepared according to a Qing Dynasty recipe

Famous people of Puli
 Lu Guimeng: Tang dynasty poet, pseudonym: Mr. Puli.
 Pi Rixiu: Tang dynasty poet, contemporary of Lu Guimeng
 Gao Qi: Ming dynasty poet
 Wang Tao: Qing dynasty reformer, writer, newspaper publisher
 Ye Shengtao: prominent novelist and educator.

Transportation
  buses between
 Luzhi and Suzhou, route 18.
 Luzhi and Kunshan
 Luzhi and Shanghai.
  Steam boats between
 Luzhi and Suzhou
 Luzhi and Kunshan

References

Bibliography

External links

  Luzhi town

Traditional folk houses in China
Tourist attractions in Suzhou
AAAA-rated tourist attractions